Sidnei Wilson Vieira David Tavares (born 29 September 2001) is a Portuguese professional footballer who plays as a midfielder for Liga Portugal 2 club Porto B.

Club career
Tavares is a product of the Leicester City academy, which he joined in 2010 at the age of 9 from local grassroots club Carib SSFC and signed his first professional contract in 2019. He made his debut in the UEFA Europa League as an 80th-minute substitute during a 2–0 defeat against Slavia Prague on 25 February 2021. The following week, on 3 March 2021, he made his first Premier League appearance as a 77th-minute substitute during a 1–1 draw against Burnley. Tavares is out of contract in summer 2021 but is reported to be in talks with the club over signing a new professional contract.
Tavares made his first Premier League start against Brighton on 6 March 2021. In that match, he produced an on-target volley from the edge of the box, only to see it saved by opposing goalkeeper Robert Sánchez.

International career
Tavares is a Portuguese youth international and represented Portugal at U18 and U19 level.

Personal life
Tavares was born in Portugal and is of Cape Verdean descent. He is the cousin of the Portugal international footballer Nani.

Career statistics

Notes

References

2001 births
Living people
Portuguese footballers
Portugal youth international footballers
Portuguese people of Cape Verdean descent
Leicester City F.C. players
Association football midfielders
Premier League players
Portuguese expatriate footballers
Portuguese expatriates in England
Expatriate footballers in England
People from Faro, Portugal
Sportspeople from Faro District
FC Porto B players
Liga Portugal 2 players